List of presidents of the House of Councillors (Japan)
List of Presidents of the House of Councillors (Morocco)